Ishtuganovo (İştuğan) is a rural locality (a village) and the administrative centre of Ishtuganovsky Selsoviet, Meleuzovsky District, Bashkortostan, Russia. The population was 339 as of 2010. There are 3 streets.

Geography 
Ishtuganovo is located 45 km east of Meleuz (the district's administrative centre) by road. Mutayevo is the nearest rural locality.

References 

Rural localities in Meleuzovsky District